Tatyana Doncheva Toteva (born 28 January 1960) is a Bulgarian politician from the Movement 21 political party, of which she is the chairperson. She has been a member of four National Assemblies. - the 38th, 39th, 40th and 45th.

Biography

Receiving an education in the field of legal studies (graduating from the juridical faculty of Sofia University), Doncheva has worked as a jurist, lawyer and prosecutor in Sofia. She is also a member of the Arbitration Commission of the Bulgarian Rhythmic Gymnastics Federation. In 2005, she was a candidate (backed by BSP and a number of other parties) to become mayor of the capital city, losing out to Boyko Borisov in the second decisive electoral round of the municipal elections. After being unable to stake a strong enough claim for the leadership position of BSP at the party congress in October 2009, Doncheva founded the PP "Movement 21" in April 2010, which does not constitute a political party, but represents the activism of citizens. Tatyana Doncheva ran in the 2016 Bulgarian Presidential Elections.

She speaks English and Russian in addition to her native Bulgarian.

Political views

Tatyana Doncheva is a vocal opponent against corruption and argues in favor of reforms in Bulgaria's justice system. Recently, she raised concern about the anti-constitutional amendments to Bulgaria's Code of Criminal Procedure which were passed by the Bulgarian Parliament in August 2017. Doncheva was worried that the new changes create more possibilities for repression: for instance, one of the new provisions permits an investigation to be kept open indefinitely.

Previously, she had argued that Bulgaria's Prosecution acts like "a shah from the Middle Ages." She also warned that Bulgaria's Prosecutor General Sotir Tsatsarov abuses his office and attacks businessmen for personal reasons. In the summer of 2017, Doncheva suspected that Tsatsarov was working towards extending his already excessive powers through negotiations behind the curtain. Sotir Tsatsarov has recently been nominated for sanctions under the US Magnitsky Act.

References

1960 births
Living people
People from Tryavna
Bulgarian Socialist Party politicians
21st-century Bulgarian lawyers
20th-century Bulgarian lawyers
Members of the National Assembly (Bulgaria)
Sofia University alumni
Bulgarian women lawyers
Candidates for President of Bulgaria